The Sportsman (1881–1904?) was a weekly newspaper published in Melbourne, Australia, devoted to sporting news, predominantly racing, with football or cricket second, with columns on handball, shooting, boxing, cycling, wrestling, swimming, yachting and other masculine sports.

The paper was founded by S. V. Winter, founder of the Herald and Weekly Times, and sold off in 1893.
Publishers in 1904 were Sporting Newspapers Proprietary, for George Russell, Howey Street, Melbourne.

In April 1904 the newspaper was advertised for sale in at least one newspaper and nothing further has been found.

Digitization
The National Library of Australia has digitized photographic copies of most issues of The Sportsman from No.51 of 8 February 1882  to No. 1,196 of 26 January 1904 that may be accessed via Trove.

It is not known whether this last issue digitized is the last printed.

References

External links 

Defunct newspapers published in Melbourne
Publications established in 1881
Publications disestablished in 1904
Weekly newspapers published in Australia
Sports newspapers published in Australia